UDMC may refer to:

 United Doctors Medical Center, a hospital in Quezon City, Philippines
 United Defense Manufacturing Corporation, a Philippine defense contractor